The Voice of Merrill is a 1952 British mystery film directed by John Gilling and starring Valerie Hobson, James Robertson Justice and Edward Underdown. The Voice of Merrill was made by Tempean Films, the company owned by the film's producers Monty Berman and Robert S. Baker, which between the late 1940s and the late 1950s specialised in turning out low-budget B-movies as unpublicised second-features for the UK cinema market. On its release however, The Voice of Merrill was recognised by its distributors, Eros Films, as unusually sophisticated and stylish for a B-movie, and was elevated to the status of co-feature in cinemas. It was released in the United States the following year under the title Murder Will Out.

It was made at Twickenham Studios with some location shooting around London. The film's sets were designed by the art director Wilfred Arnold.

Plot
A convicted female blackmailer is found murdered in her flat and suspicion falls on three men, all of whom the police believe might have had a motive:  struggling author Hugh Allen (Edward Underdown) was involved in a relationship with the dead woman; Allen's publisher Ronald Parker (Henry Kendall), who had been blackmailed out of several thousand pounds while she was in his employ, and playwright Jonathan Roach (James Robertson Justice) who knew the woman but is evasive about the exact nature of their acquaintance.  None of the three can provide a verifiable alibi for the time of the murder, so Inspector Thornton (Garry Marsh) decides to shadow them in the belief that sooner or later the guilty party will betray himself.

Meanwhile, Allen has fallen in love with Roach's wife Alycia (Valerie Hobson), who is tired of her loveless marriage, and the pair begin an affair.  Roach is suffering from a heart condition and his life expectancy may be as little as a few months.  He has written an episodic radio play, "The Voice of Merrill", which he wants to present anonymously and he agrees to Alycia's suggestion that Allen should be the narrator on the broadcasts.  Alycia persuades Allen to go along with a plot to pass off the play as Allen's own work in an attempt to boost his career.  Alycia then poisons Roach with his medications, trusting that his death will be attributed to his medical condition.  But Thornton knows about her affair with Allen, and when Roach dies, Thornton has suspicions, and Alycia is horrified when he informs her that an autopsy will be carried out.  Allen tells Alycia that he will confess to the murder rather than see her charged, but she attempts to dissuade him.  When the autopsy results come back, they show that Roach died of natural causes, so the couple believe that they are off the hook.

However, prior to his death, Roach had seen newspaper reports that Allen was the anonymous "Merrill", and was angry that Allen was not denying them. So he has set up an elaborate posthumous revenge, and, as the last episode of "The Voice of Merrill" is broadcast, Thornton realises that the storyline is pointing him towards the blackmailer's killer.

Cast
 Valerie Hobson as Alycia Roach
 James Robertson Justice as Jonathan Roach
 Edward Underdown as Hugh Allen
 Henry Kendall as Ronald Parker
 Garry Marsh as Inspector Thornton
 Sam Kydd as Sgt. Baker
 Ian Fleming as Dr. Forrest
 Daniel Wherry as Pierce
 Daphne Newton as Miss Quinn
 Alvar Lidell as Radio Announcer

Critical reception
The film historians Steve Chibnall and Brian McFarlane praise the performances of Valerie Hobson and James Robertson Justice, and add: "The plot, which moves with exemplary speed and fluency towards its downbeat ending, and Berman's camerawork collude with a strong cast to produce an ingenious specimen of murder-mystery drama."

References

External links 
 
 
 

1952 films
1950s mystery thriller films
British mystery thriller films
Films directed by John Gilling
British black-and-white films
Films shot at Twickenham Film Studios
Films shot in London
Films set in London
1950s English-language films
1950s British films